Chiarello is a surname. Notable people with the surname include:

Francesco Domenico Chiarello (1898–2008), Italian WWI and WWII veteran
Jo Chiarello (born 1963), Italian singer
Mark Chiarello, American painter, art director and editor
Michael Chiarello (born 1962), American celebrity chef